The Marivan border crossing attack was an attack by Kurdistani forces against an Iranian border crossing. It occurred on July  21, 2018, conducted by  PJAK forces. The attack took place near the village of Dari, from the city of Marivan, Kurdistan. Ten Iranian Revolutionary Guard Corps soldiers were killed and eight were wounded.

Attack
On Saturday, July 21, 2018, at around 2:30 am, a squad of armed PJAK attacked the border guard station of Hamza Sayyid al-Shohada. According to the commander of the Marivan station, the attack occurred in a vulnerable part of the station, leading to the explosion of the station's ammunition dump and killing 10 IRGC soldiers and one soldier from Basij.

Reaction 
PJAK claimed responsibility for the attack.

See also
2018 Iraqi Kurdistan missile strike
2017 Deir ez-Zor missile strike

References 

2018 in military history
2018 in Iraqi Kurdistan